Heartbreak is the eighth album by American R&B group Shalamar, released in 1984 on the SOLAR label.  It features a new line-up of Delisa Davis, Micki Free and Howard Hewett (Davis and Free having replaced Jeffrey Daniel and Jody Watley who had both left the group after the release of the previous album The Look). The album features Grammy nominated songs included on the Footloose 
and Beverly Hills Cop soundtracks. This would be Hewett's last album with the group before embarking on a solo career.

Heartbreak peaked at No. 32 on the R&B chart and No. 90 on the Billboard chart.  The Grammy nominated song "Dancing in the Sheets" was included on the Multi-Platinum chart-topping soundtrack album of the film Footloose, while Don't Get Stopped in Beverly Hills featured on the Multi-Platinum 
Beverly Hills Cop soundtrack won the group a Grammy. Heartbreak went Gold in the United States for sales over 500,000.

Track listing

Singles

Personnel 
Delissa Davis - Keyboards, Vocals
George Duke - Keyboards
Micki Free - Guitar, Guitar (Rhythm), Guitar (Synthesizer), Vocals
Chuck Gentry - Guitar, Keyboards, Sequencing Programmer, Vocals, Vocals (Background)
Mitch Gibson - Assistant Engineer
Hawk - Drum Programming, Guitar, Keyboards, Synthesizer
Howard Hewett - Vocals, Vocals (Background)
Joyce "Fenderella" Irby - Vocals, Vocals (Background)
Paul Jackson, Jr. - Guitar
John "J.R." Robinson - Percussion
Barry Sarna - Keyboards
Ernie Watts - Saxophone
David Williams - Guitar, Guitar (Rhythm)
Bill Wolfer - Keyboards, Synthesizer
William "Dr. Z." Zimmerman - Sequencing Programmer

References

Shalamar albums
1984 albums
SOLAR Records albums